
Ch'iyar Quta (Aymara ch'iyara black, quta lake, "black lake", hispanicized spellings Chiar Khota, Chiar Kkota, Chiar Quota) is a lake in the Cordillera Real of Bolivia situated in the La Paz Department, Los Andes Province, Pucarani Municipality, Huayna Potosí Canton. It is situated at a height of about 4,700  metres (15,400 ft) near the peaks of Kunturiri and east of the lake Juri Quta.

References

External links 
 Pucarani Municipality: population data and map

Lakes of La Paz Department (Bolivia)